Enrique Pérez Díaz (28 December 1938 – 10 February 2021), known as Pachín, was a Spanish football defender and manager.

Club career
Born in Torrelavega, Cantabria, Pachín signed with Real Madrid in 1959 from Segunda División club CA Osasuna. He made his La Liga debut on 11 September 1960 in a 1–0 away loss against Atlético Madrid, then proceeded to be a starter in that and the following four seasons.

Pachín left the Merengues in May 1968, having appeared in 218 competitive games and scored two goals. He won 11 major titles during his spell, including seven national championships and the 1960 and 1966 editions of the European Cup, contributing to the latter conquests with eight appearances and a total of 32 during his career.

Aged nearly 30, Pachín returned to division two for the 1968–69 campaign, where he represented Real Betis. He retired in 1971 after a stint with amateurs Club Deportivo Toluca, then worked as a manager for 16 years, never in higher than the second tier – his biggest achievement was to promote Hércules CF to the top flight in 1984, even though he was only in charge for six matches.

International career
Pachín won eight caps for the Spain national team, in three years. His first came on 15 May 1960 in a 3–0 friendly win over England, and he was selected for the squad that competed at the 1962 FIFA World Cup, appearing against Mexico and Brazil in an eventual group stage exit.

Death
Pachín died on 10 February 2021 in Madrid, aged 82.

Honours
Real Madrid
La Liga: 1960–61, 1961–62, 1962–63, 1963–64, 1964–65, 1966–67, 1967–68
Copa del Generalísimo: 1961–62
European Cup: 1959–60,1965–66
Intercontinental Cup: 1960

References

External links

Biography at Real Madrid Fans 

1938 births
2021 deaths
People from Torrelavega
Spanish footballers
Footballers from Cantabria
Association football defenders
La Liga players
Segunda División players
Tercera División players
Gimnástica de Torrelavega footballers
Burgos CF (1936) footballers
CA Osasuna players
Real Madrid CF players
Real Betis players
UEFA Champions League winning players
Spain under-21 international footballers
Spain international footballers
1962 FIFA World Cup players
Spanish football managers
Segunda División managers
Segunda División B managers
CA Osasuna managers
Real Valladolid managers
Levante UD managers
Córdoba CF managers
Hércules CF managers
Albacete Balompié managers
Granada CF managers